The Adelaide state by-election, 1971 was a by-election held on 3 July 1971 for the South Australian House of Assembly seat of Adelaide. This was triggered by the death of state Labor MHA Sam Lawn.

Results
The Communist Party, who contested the previous election on 4.9 percent of the vote, did not contest the by-election. Labor easily retained the seat.

See also
List of South Australian state by-elections

References

South Australian state by-elections
1971 elections in Australia
1970s in Adelaide
July 1971 events in Australia